Greeff's giant gecko (Hemidactylus greeffii) is a species of gecko, a lizard in the family Gekkonidae. The species is found on islands in the Gulf of Guinea off the east coast of Africa.

Etymology
The specific name, greeffii, is in honor of German zoologist Richard Greeff, who collected the holotype.

Geographic range
H. greeffii is endemic to the island of São Tomé and the associated islet of Ilhéu das Rolas, both in the nation of São Tomé and Príncipe. It does not occur on the island of Príncipe.

Reproduction
H. greeffii is oviparous.

Taxonomy
The species H. greeffii was described and named by José Vicente Barbosa du Bocage in 1886 when he visited the archipelago describing wildlife.

References

Further reading
Bocage, J. V. Barboza du (1886). "Reptis e Amphibios de S. Tomé ". Jornal de Sciencias Mathematicas Physicas e Naturaes, Academia Real das Sciencias de Lisboa 11: 65–70. (Hemidactylus greeffii, new species, pp. 66–68). (in Portuguese).
Boulenger GA (1887). Catalogue of the Lizards in the British Museum (Natural History). Second Edition. Volume III. Lacertidæ, Gerrhosauridæ, Scincidæ, Anelytropidæ, Dibamidæ, Chamæleontidæ. London: Trustees of the British Museum (Natural History). (Taylor and Francis, printers). xii + 575 pp. + Plates I-XL. (Hemidactylus greeffii, p. 484 in "Addenda and Corrigenda").

External links

greeffii
Fauna of São Tomé Island
Endemic vertebrates of São Tomé and Príncipe
Ilhéu das Rolas
Reptiles described in 1886
Taxa named by José Vicente Barbosa du Bocage